The Shekhan District is a district in the Nineveh Governorate with its capital at Ain Sifni.

It is bordered by the Amadiya and Dahuk Districts of the Dahuk Governorate to the north, the Akre District to the east, Al-Hamdaniya District to the south, and the Tel Kaif District to the west. Baadre, considered the political capital of the Yazidis, is also in this district.

History

The Shekhan District was formed on December 16, 1924. After the 1935 Yazidi revolt, the district was placed under military control.

Demographics

It is mainly populated by Yazidis with a large Assyrian minority.

See also 
Assyrian homeland
Proposals for Assyrian autonomy in Iraq
List of Yazidi settlements

References

Districts of Dohuk Province